Çağşak can refer to:

 Çağşak, Çorum
 Çağşak, Mudurnu